This is a list of decisions and opinions of the Enlarged Board of Appeal of the European Patent Office (EPO) in chronological order of their date of issuance. The list includes decisions under  (following a referral from a Board of Appeal), opinions under  (following a referral from the President of the EPO), "to ensure uniform application of the law" and to clarify or interpret important points of law in relation to the European Patent Convention, and decisions on a request for a proposal of removal from Office of a member of the Boards of Appeal under . The list does not include decisions on petitions for review under .

The list is incomplete.

Decided cases

1980 – 1989

1990 – 1994

1995 – 1999

2000 – 2004

2005 – 2009

2010 – 2014

2015 – 2019

From 2020

Pending cases 
As of 25 February 2022, three referrals are pending before the Enlarged Board of Appeal.

See also 
 List of patent case law
 List of successful petitions for review under Article 112a of the European Patent Convention

References

External links 
 Enlarged Board of Appeal decisions and opinions, on the EPO website 
 Index of decisions and opinions of the Enlarged Board of Appeal published in the Official Journal of the EPO, on the EPO web site

Enlarged Board of Appeal of the European Patent Office
Case law of the Enlarged Board of Appeal of the European Patent Office